Leandro Climaco Pinto (born 24 January 1994) is a Brazilian footballer who plays as a centre back for Radnik in Serbian SuperLiga.

Career
He started his professional career at Olympiacos. He spent the first season as a loanee to Doxa Drama, where he made 15 appearances. After consecutives loans to Kalloni, PAS Giannina, and Lamia he left Olympiacos as a free agent. On 9 September 2015 he joined Lamia. Despite his good performances he left the club in July 2016. Despite being linked with AEL he chose to join Trikala. On 22 December 2016 he scored his first goal in a 3–0 home win against Panthrakikos. He was good throughout the season but his team failed to win promotion to the Superleague. After a short spell with Doxa Katokopias, he returned to Trikala on 4 January 2018. At the end of the season, he was brought by same level side Olympiakos Volos, but got no chances to play, so in the following winter-break he was up to something new and different, he left Greece, and signed with newly promoted Serbian SuperLiga side FK Proleter Novi Sad where he grabbed a place as center-back and made 14 appearances already in his opening half-season in Serbia.

References

External links
 

Living people
1993 births
Brazilian footballers
Association football central defenders
Super League Greece players
Football League (Greece) players
Cypriot First Division players
Serbian SuperLiga players
Olympiacos F.C. players
Doxa Drama F.C. players
PAS Giannina F.C. players
PAS Lamia 1964 players
Trikala F.C. players
Doxa Katokopias FC players
FK Proleter Novi Sad players
FK TSC Bačka Topola players
Brazilian expatriate footballers
Expatriate footballers in Greece
Brazilian expatriate sportspeople in Greece
Expatriate footballers in Cyprus
Brazilian expatriate sportspeople in Cyprus
Expatriate footballers in Serbia
Brazilian expatriate sportspeople in Serbia
Footballers from São Paulo